Paragrallator is an ichnogenus of dinosaur footprint. Its ichnospecies have been found in China and Lesotho.

See also

 List of dinosaur ichnogenera

References

Dinosaur trace fossils
Theropods